Clarisse is a female given name borrowed from French, derived from the Italian and Latin name Clarissa, originally denoting a nun of the Roman Catholic Order of St. Clare. Clarice is an anglicization of Clarisse and there are numerous cognate names, including Clara, Clare, and Claire as well as the surnames Sinclair and St. Clair. Notable people and characters with the name include:

People
 Clarisse Agbegnenou (born 1992), French judoka
 Clarisse Albrecht (born 1978), French musical artist
 Clarisse Bader (1840–1902), French writer
 Clarisse Coignet (1823–1918), French moral philosopher, educator, and historian
 Clarisse Cruz (born 1978), Portuguese runner
 Clarisse Crémer (born 1989), French offshore sailor
 Clarisse Doris Hellman (1910–1973), American historian of science
 Clarisse Garcia (basketball) (born 1984), American basketball coach
 Clarisse Herrenschmidt (born 1946), French archaeologist and linguist
 Clarisse Imaniriho, Rwandan politician
 Clarisse Iribagiza (born 1988), Rwandan computer scientist
 Clarisse Karasira (born 1997), Rwandan artist and humanitarian
 Clarisse Le Bihan (born 1994), French professional footballer
 Clarisse Leite (1917–2003), Brazilian composer, pianist and music educator
 Clarisse Loxton Peacock (died 2004), Hungarian-born artist later styled Lady Dunnett
 Clarisse Machanguana (born 1984), Mozambican basketball player and philanthropist
 Clarisse Midroy (1820–1870), French actress
 Clarisse Moh (born 1986), French middle-distance runner
 Clarisse Rasoarizay (born 1971), Malagasy long-distance runner
 Clarisse Ratsifandrihamanana (1926–1987), Malagasy writer
 Clarisse de Souza, Brazilian professor of human–computer interaction
 Clarisse Tremblay (1951–1999), Canadian journalist and poet
 Clarisse Vigoureux (1789–1865), French Fourierist journalist and writer
 Clarisse Yeung (born 1986), Hong Kong politician

Characters
 Clarisse La Rue, a character introduced in Rick Riordan's Percy Jackson and the Olympians
 Clarisse McClellan, a character from Ray Bradbury's novel Fahrenheit 451
 Clarisse Renaldi, a character from The Princess Diaries
 Princess Clarisse, a character in The Castle of Cagliostro

See also
 Clarisse (disambiguation)
 Clarissa (given name)